Khaneh Khal-e Olya (also Romanized as Khāneh Khal-e ‘Olyā; also known as Khāneh Khal) is a village in Bask-e Kuleseh Rural District, in the Central District of Sardasht County, West Azerbaijan Province, Iran. At the 2006 census, its population was 160, in 30 families.

References 

Populated places in Sardasht County